Hans Peter Nielsen may refer to:
Hans Peter Nielsen (politician) (1852–1928), Danish politician
Hans Peter Nielsen (gymnast) (born 1943), Danish Olympic gymnast